Custer City is a town in Custer County, Oklahoma, United States. Custer City is northeast of Clinton and northwest of Weatherford along Oklahoma 33.  The population was 375 at the 2010 census.

Custer City was originally known as Graves, and a post office was established there on January 22, 1894.  The post office changed its name to Custer City on September 28, 1904, in honor of Lt. Col. George Armstrong Custer.

Geography

Demographics

As of the census of 2000, there were 393 people, 169 households, and 110 families residing in the town. There were 206 housing units at an average density of 342.4 per square mile (132.6/km2). The racial makeup of the town was 94.66% White, 3.56% Native American, 0.51% from other races, and 1.27% from two or more races. Hispanic or Latino of any race were 1.53% of the population.

There were 169 households, out of which 29.0% had children under the age of 18 living with them, 56.2% were married couples living together, 5.9% had a female householder with no husband present, and 34.9% were non-families. 32.5% of all households were made up of individuals, and 13.0% had someone living alone who was 65 years of age or older. The average household size was 2.33 and the average family size was 2.93.

In the town, the population was spread out, with 24.4% under the age of 18, 8.7% from 18 to 24, 23.4% from 25 to 44, 26.5% from 45 to 64, and 17.0% who were 65 years of age or older. The median age was 39 years. For every 100 females, there were 95.5 males. For every 100 females age 18 and over, there were 103.4 males.

The median income for a household in the town was $30,500, and the median income for a family was $39,000. Males had a median income of $33,571 versus $13,409 for females. The per capita income for the town was $15,165. About 18.4% of families and 27.1% of the population were below the poverty line, including 54.8% of those under age 18 and 14.1% of those age 65 or over.

Historical Sites

Custer City has three NRHP-listed sites:
 Broadway Hotel
 First National Bank of Custer City
 J.J. Pyeatt’s General Store (off SH-33)

Notable people
 William Brinkley (1917–1993), author and reporter
 Tom Turner (1916-1986), Major League Baseball player

References

External links
 Wilson, Linda D. "Custer City," Encyclopedia of Oklahoma History and Culture, 2009. Accessed March 18, 2015.

Towns in Oklahoma
Towns in Custer County, Oklahoma